David Adams and Menno Oosting were the defending champions, but did not participate this year.

Tomás Carbonell and Francisco Roig won in the final 6–4, 7–6, against Emanuel Couto and João Cunha e Silva.

Seeds

Draw

Draw

External links
 Draw

1995 ATP Tour
1995 Grand Prix Hassan II